Tik Tok is a 2016 Chinese-South Korean suspense crime drama film directed by Li Jun and starring Wallace Chung, Lee Jung-jae and Lang Yueting. It was released in China by China Film Group Corporation on July 15, 2016.

Plot
Guo Zhida plans a bomb explosion near a soccer stadium to take away money from a gambling group. Police officer Jiang and psychologist Yang cooperate to stop him and investigate his plan.

Cast
 Wallace Chung     ...	Guo Zhihua / Guo Zhida
 Lee Jung-jae      ...	Jiang Chengjun
 Lang Yueting 	        ...	Yang Xi
 Chae-yeong Lee        ...	An Caixi
 Fan Yang	        ...	Li Zhiyu

Reception
The film has grossed  at the Chinese box office.

References
 https://www.imdb.com/title/tt6033150/fullcredits?ref_=tt_cl_sm#cast
 http://www.cbooo.cn/m/644032
 https://movie.douban.com/subject/26375609/
Tik Tok App Ban in india

Chinese crime drama films
Chinese suspense films
2016 crime drama films
2010s Mandarin-language films
China Film Group Corporation films
South Korean crime drama films
2010s South Korean films